Kompánek may refer to:

Vladimír Kompánek (1927–2011), Slovak composer
Sonny Kompánek, composer and conductor (e.g. see Gone till November)